Godzięby  is a village in the administrative district of Gmina Krośniewice, within Kutnowski County, Łódzkie Voivodeship, in north-eastern Poland.

References

Godzięby